Jane S. Baker (born July 8, 1945) is a former Republican member of the Pennsylvania House of Representatives.

She attended Penn State University from 1963 to 1965 and graduated from Cedar Crest College in 1967. She was first elected in 2000 and served one term before her retirement in 2002.

References

External links
 official PA House profile (archived)

Living people
1945 births
Republican Party members of the Pennsylvania House of Representatives
Women state legislators in Pennsylvania
21st-century American women